Fairlie railway station serves the village of Fairlie, North Ayrshire, Scotland. The station is managed by ScotRail and is on the Ayrshire Coast Line.

History 

The station was originally opened on 1 June 1880 by the Glasgow and South Western Railway during the extension of the former Ardrossan Railway to Largs. It was renamed Fairlie Town on 30 June 1952, however this name was short-lived and the station became Fairlie High on 2 March 1953. A camping coach was positioned here by the Scottish Region from 1954 to 1955, two coaches from 1956 to 1957 and two coaches again from 1961 to 1963. The station was renamed back to its original title some time before 1986.

Following the construction of Hunterston A nuclear power station, a siding was provided for flask trains, which was subsequently used for Hunterston B. In the mid 1990s, this was moved to the Hunterston Ore Terminal.

Originally a two platform station, it now has only one platform, the former northbound platform. The southbound platform was demolished and its track removed as part of the electrification of the Largs branch of the Ayrshire Coast Line in 1986.

Services 
 1tph to Largs
 1tph to Glasgow Central via  and 

The basic service runs throughout the week, including Sundays (though Sunday trains make additional mainline stops). Additional trains run during the weekday business peaks.

References

Notes

Sources

External links
Fairlie Station with a train for Largs

Railway stations in North Ayrshire
Former Glasgow and South Western Railway stations
Railway stations in Great Britain opened in 1880
Railway stations served by ScotRail
SPT railway stations